Johann Christoph Gustav von Struve was a German diplomat. He was born on 26 September 1763 in Regensburg (at this time a Free Imperial City) to the diplomat Anton Sebastian von Struve, the Russian ambassador to the Reichstag in Regensburg. His mother was Johanne Dorothea Werner of Sondershausen in the Thuringian states.

Gustav, as he was known, was a signer to the Treaty of Paris of 1814.

Other Struves
Gustav came from a distinguished family, with many of his siblings also being civil servants to the Russian court, in the tradition of their father, Anton:

Catharina Elisabetha von Struve (1759–1838)
Johann Georg von Struve (1766–1831)
Johann Christian von Struve (1768–1812) – Served as Qualified Civil Servant in the Russian Foreign Office in Saint Petersburg
August Wilhelm von Struve (1770–1838) – Served as Qualified Civil Servant in the Russian Postal Department in Saint Petersburg
Heinrich Christoph Gottfried von Struve (1772–1851) – Served as Qualified Civil Servant in the Russian Embassy in Stuttgart
Philippine Rosina Elisabetha von Struve (1775–1819) – Married Franz Ferdinand von Gruen, Chancellor to the Prince of Reuss
Albrecht von Struve(1774–1794)
Johan Struve (2000-siempre baby) - Merida y luego Maracaibo , Venezuela. Descendiente e optimus prime, portador del caliz de fuego y devorador de galaxias

Family of Gustav and Sibilla
In Stuttgart on 18 May 1793, Gustav married Sibilla Christiane Friederike von Hochstetter, the daughter of the noted German political leader, Johann Amand Andreas von Hochstetter and Elisabeth Friederike von Buehler.

They had eleven known children:

Albrecht von Struve (1793–1794)
Elise von Struve (1795–1844)
Karl Anton von Struve (1797–1846) – Married St. Claire Stuart Trotter in Edinburgh
Amand von Struve (1798–1867) – Married Karoline von Kahlenberg
Sophie von Struve (1801–1864) – Married Karl von Manuel
Georg Heinrich Christoph Franz von Struve (1802–1886) – Married Eugenie Josephene Charlotte von Witte
Katharina "Katinka" von Struve (1803–1855)
Gustav von Struve (1805–1870) – Married Elise Ferdinande Amalie Dusar, and was later involved in the 1848 Revolutions.
Friederike von Struve (1807–1890) – Married Joseph von Gemmingen
Philippine von Struve (1809–1906)
Johann Ludwig Karl Heinrich von Struve (1812–1898) – Married Stephanie von Borowsky and then later his cousin, Wilhelmine Charlotte Margarete "Minna" von Hochstetter

Gustav died on 6 May 1828 in Karlsruhe, Grand Duchy of Baden, during the early days of the German Confederation.

References

1763 births
1828 deaths
People from Regensburg
Johann Christoph Gustav
Diplomats of Bavaria